Globivenus rigida, or the rigid Venus clam, is a species of bivalve mollusc in the family Veneridae. It can be found along the Atlantic coast of North America, ranging from southern Florida to the West Indies and Brazil.

References

Veneridae
Bivalves described in 1817